Ali Hasnain (born 10 April 1992) is a Pakistani cricketer. He made his List A debut for Multan in the 2018–19 Quaid-e-Azam One Day Cup on 24 October 2018.

References

External links
 

1992 births
Living people
Pakistani cricketers
Multan cricketers
Place of birth missing (living people)